The Law of Things is an album by the New Zealand band The Bats, released in 1990. It was released by Mammoth Records in the United States.

The track "Smoking Her Wings" was released as a single, and the album peaked at #38 in the New Zealand charts.

Production
The album was recorded at Writhe Recording in Wellington, New Zealand, toward the end of 1988. It was produced by Brent McLachlan and the band.

Critical reception
Trouser Press called the album "monumental," writing: "Capturing all the hooky appeal and personal charm of their first records, it updates the recipe with seven years of instrumental mastery and superior sonics." The New York Times wrote that "the production is raw; the song structures are almost self-consciously unsophisticated - just jaunty guitar riffs, roughshod 4/4 rhythms and, in the more aggressive tracks, base lines that rumble and swell and even drown out the other instruments."

Track listing

Personnel
Malcolm Grant - drums
Paul Kean - bass
Robert Scott - guitar, lead vocals
Kaye Woodward - guitar, vocals

Also credited:
Alastair Galbraith - violin (tracks: 1, 4 to 8, 12)
Brent McLachlan - engineer, co-producer

References

1990 albums
The Bats (New Zealand band) albums
Flying Nun Records albums
Dunedin Sound albums